This is a list of main career statistics of Australian former professional tennis player Pat Rafter. All statistics are according to the ATP World Tour and ITF website.

Grand Slam tournaments

Singles: 4 (2 titles, 2 runner-ups)

Doubles: 1 (1 title)

Other significant finals

Grand Slam Cup finals

Singles: 1 (0–1)

Masters Series tournaments

Singles: 6 (2 titles, 4 runner-ups)

Doubles: 4 (2 titles, 2 runner-ups)

Career finals

ATP Tour finals

Singles: 25 (11 titles, 14 runner-ups)

Doubles: 18 (10 titles, 8 runner-ups)

Performance timelines

Singles 

1 Held as Stockholm Masters until 1994, Stuttgart Masters from 1995 to 2001.

Doubles 

1 Held as Stockholm Masters until 1994, Stuttgart Masters from 1995 to 2001.

Top 10 wins

Career Grand Slam tournament seedings 
The tournaments won by Rafter are bolded.

Singles

Doubles

Summer Olympics matches

Singles

ATP Tour career earnings 
This list is incomplete; you can help by expanding it.

References 

Rafter, Pat